The 1919 U.S. Open was the 23rd U.S. Open, held June 9–12 at Brae Burn Country Club in West Newton, Massachusetts, a suburb west of Boston. In the first U.S. Open since 1916, Walter Hagen defeated Mike Brady by one stroke in an 18-hole playoff to win his second and final U.S. Open. It was the second of Hagen's eleven major titles. The championship was not held in 1917 and 1918 due to the First World War.

Charles Hoffner, age 22, opened the tournament with a 72 to take the first round lead, but he fell off the pace with a 78 in the second round. Mike Brady carded consecutive rounds of 74 to take the 36-hole lead by two over Hoffner, with Walter Hagen in a group three back. Brady shot 73 in the third round and opened up a commanding five-shot lead over Hagen. In the final round, he stumbled to an 80 for 301 total, allowing Hagen back into the championship. Hagen had a 10-footer (3 m) to win at the 18th, but his putt lipped out.

In the playoff the next day, Hagen carried a two-stroke lead to the 17th but then bogeyed to see his lead cut to one. But both players made par on the 18th, giving Hagen the title. Hagen's victory in the playoff came after he partied with entertainer Al Jolson all night before showing up to play.

This was the first U.S. Open to be played over three days, with the first and second rounds played on the first two days and the third and final rounds played on the last day (Wednesday). It reverted to the two-day schedule the following year; the three-day schedule returned in 1926 and the four-day schedule began in 1965.

Willie Chisholm set an unfortunate tournament record in the first round at the par-3 8th hole. His approach shot landed in a rocky ravine and he took several shots to get out. He eventually settled for an 18 on the hole, a dubious record that would stand until a 19 was recorded in 1938.

Defending champion Chick Evans finished twelve strokes back in tenth place and was the low amateur.

Past champions in the field 

Source:

Round summaries

First round
Monday, June 9, 1919

Source:

Second round
Tuesday, June 10, 1919

Source:

Third round
Wednesday, June 11, 1919   (morning)

Source:

Final round
Wednesday, June 11, 1919   (afternoon)

Source:
(a) denotes amateur

Playoff 
Thursday, June 12, 1919

Source:

References

External links
USGA Championship Database
USOpen.com - 1919

U.S. Open (golf)
U.S. Open (golf)
U.S. Open golf
History of Middlesex County, Massachusetts
Golf in Massachusetts
U.S. Open (golf)
Newton, Massachusetts
Sports competitions in Massachusetts
Sports in Middlesex County, Massachusetts
Tourist attractions in Middlesex County, Massachusetts
U.S. Open (golf)